City of Crime is a Batman comic book story arc written by David Lapham, with art by Ramon Bachs and Nathan Massengill.  It was originally published in 13 parts by DC Comics from January 2005 through February 2006 for Detective Comics, issues 800 through 808, then issues 811 through 814, and then later compiled as a trade paperback. These individual comics started in January 2005 and ended February 2006.

Plot
In City of Crime, Batman investigates the disappearance of a young girl and unravels a labyrinthine conspiracy that stretches from Gotham City's powerful elites to its forgotten poor. In order to save the city he has sworn to protect, Batman will have to face old foes and a new nemesis spawned from its very depths. Noted villains appear in this novel such as The Ventriloquist, Mr. Freeze, and The Penguin. The universe that this story takes place in is the New Earth Universe.

Reception
The reception for Batman: City of Crime has been generally positive. Readcomics.org praised the dark atmosphere and gritty character design. Further comment was given on the story not needing to rely on heavy character deaths or integral changes to the whole Batman universe. Reviewers expressed surprise at the dark, gritty, and often-graphic images this comic portrayed. They compared to other highly praised Batman titles, such as War Games. This graphic novel has also been praised by "bringing horror back to Batman."

Issues
 #800 "Allone at Night"
 #801 "City of Crime Part 1"
 #802 "The Secret Keepers"
 #803 "The Horror Show"
 #804 "All You Need Is Love"
 #805 "The Heating Up"
 #806 "A City. Not My Own"
 #807 "Crown Point"
 #808 "The New Face"
 #811 "The Experiment"
 #812 "Pearls and Fine China"
 #813 "A Place of Fear"
 #814 "The Big Show"

References

Batman storylines
2006 in comics